This is a list of video games for the GameCube video game console that have sold or shipped at least one million copies. The best-selling game on the GameCube is Super Smash Bros. Melee. First released in Japan on November 21, 2001, it went on to sell just over 7.4 million units worldwide. The second best-selling game was Mario Kart: Double Dash, selling 6.96 million units. Super Mario Sunshine is the console's third best-selling game, with 6.28 million units.

There are a total of 35 GameCube games on this list which are confirmed to have sold or shipped at least one million units. Of these, eight were developed by internal Nintendo development divisions. Other developers with the most million-selling titles include Hudson Soft and Namco with four games each, and Capcom with three games. Of the 35 games on this list, 28 were published in one or more regions by Nintendo. Other publishers with multiple million-selling games include Capcom with three games, and Sega and The Pokémon Company both with two games. The most popular franchises on GameCube include Sonic the Hedgehog (3.1million combined sales), Resident Evil (4.2million combined sales), The Legend of Zelda (5.75million combined sales), and most notably Mario (26.68million combined sales).

By 2010, over 208.57million total copies of games had been sold for the GameCube. Despite coming in at 3rd place during the 6th generation of video game consoles, it had the highest attach rate of any Nintendo console at 9.59.

List

Notes

References

External links
 Nintendo official homepage

 
GameCube
Best-selling GameCube video games